Karel Klančnik (30 May 1917 in Mojstrana – 8 December 2009) was a Yugoslavian ski jumper who competed in the late 1940s and early 1950s. He finished 23rd in the individual large hill at the 1948 Winter Olympics and tied for 29th in the same event at the 1952 Winter Olympics.

Klančnik's best career finish was 13th in an individual normal hill event in Austria in 1953. At the time of his death, he was one of the oldest living Slovenian athletes.

References

External links

Olympic ski jumping results: 1948-60
Notice of Karel Klančnik's death 

1917 births
2009 deaths
Yugoslav male ski jumpers
Slovenian male ski jumpers
Ski jumpers at the 1948 Winter Olympics
Ski jumpers at the 1952 Winter Olympics
Olympic ski jumpers of Yugoslavia
People from the Municipality of Kranjska Gora